The Azores, officially the Autonomous Region of the Azores, is one of the two autonomous regions of Portugal (along with Madeira).

Its main industries are agriculture, dairy farming, livestock, fishing, and tourism, which has become a major service activity in the region. The government of the Azores employs a large percentage of the population directly or indirectly in the service and tertiary sectors. The largest city of the Azores is Ponta Delgada. The culture, dialect, cuisine, and traditions of the Azorean islands vary considerably, because these remote islands were settled sporadically over a span of two centuries.

There are nine major Azorean islands and an islet cluster, in three main groups. These are Flores and Corvo, to the west; Graciosa, Terceira, São Jorge, Pico, and Faial in the centre; and São Miguel, Santa Maria, and the Formigas islets to the east. All of the islands have volcanic origins, although some, such as Santa Maria, have had no recorded activity in the time since the islands were settled several centuries ago. If measured from their base at the bottom of the ocean to their peaks, which thrust high above the surface of the Atlantic, the Azores are among the tallest mountains on the planet.

The climate of the Azores is very mild for such a northerly location, being influenced by its distance from the continents and by the passing Gulf Stream. Because of the marine influence, temperatures remain mild year-round. Daytime temperatures normally fluctuate between  depending on season. Temperatures above  or below  are unknown in the major population centres. It is also generally wet and cloudy.

History

A small number of alleged hypogea (underground structures carved into rocks) have been identified on the islands of Corvo, Santa Maria, and Terceira by Portuguese archaeologist Nuno Ribeiro, who speculated that they might date back 2,000 years, implying a human presence on the island before the Portuguese. These structures have been used by settlers in the Azores to store grain and the suggestion by Ribeiro that they might be burial sites is unconfirmed. Detailed examination and dating to authenticate the validity of these speculations is lacking; thus it is unclear whether these structures are natural or human-made and whether they predate the 15th century Portuguese colonization of the Azores.

According to a 2015 paper published in Journal of Evolutionary Biology, research based on mouse mitochondrial DNA points to a Scandinavian rather than Portuguese origin of the local mouse population. Some years later, a 2021 paper published in Proceedings of the National Academy of Sciences, using data from lake sediment core sampling suggests brush-clearing was undertaken and animal husbandry introduced between 700 and 850 C.E. Together, these findings suggest a brief period of Norse settlement and the 2021 paper further cites climate simulations carried out that suggest the dominant winds in the North Atlantic Ocean in that period blew from the northeast, which would have taken Viking ships heading southwest from Scandinavia more or less directly to the Azores.

Discovery

The islands were known to Europeans in the 14th century; parts of them appear in the Catalan Atlas, created in 1375. In 1427, a captain sailing for Prince Henry the Navigator, possibly Gonçalo Velho, may have rediscovered the Azores but this is not certain. In Thomas Ashe's 1813 work, A History of the Azores, the author identified a Fleming, Joshua Vander Berg of Bruges, who made landfall in the archipelago during a storm on his way to Lisbon. According to Ashe, the Portuguese explored the area and claimed it for Portugal. Other writers note the discovery of the first islands (São Miguel, Santa Maria and Terceira) by sailors in the service of Henry the Navigator, although there are few documents to support such claims.

There were no large animals on Santa Maria; after its discovery and before settlement began, sheep were let loose on the island to supply future settlers with food.

Early settlement
The archipelago was largely settled from mainland Portugal but settlement did not take place right away. Gonçalo Velho Cabral gathered resources and settlers for the next three years (1433–1436) and sailed to establish colonies, first on Santa Maria and then on São Miguel. Settlers built houses, established villages and cleared bush and rocks to plant crops, grain, grapevines, sugar cane and other plants suitable for local use and for export. They brought domesticated animals, such as chickens, rabbits, cattle, sheep, goats and pigs. The settlement of the unoccupied islands started in 1439 with people mainly from the continental provinces of Algarve and Alentejo, in mainland Portugal. São Miguel was first settled in 1449, the settlers – mainly from the Estremadura, Alto Alentejo and Algarve areas of mainland Portugal – under the command of Gonçalo Velho Cabral, who landed at the site of modern-day Povoação.

Flemish settlers
The first reference to the island of São Jorge was made in 1439 but the date of discovery is unknown. In 1443, the island was already inhabited but settlement only began after the arrival of the noble Flemish native Willem van der Haegen. Arriving at Topo, São Jorge, where he lived and died, he became known as Guilherme da Silveira to the islanders. João Vaz Corte-Real received the captaincy of the island in 1483. Velas became a town before the end of the 15th century. By 1490, there were 2,000 Flemings living on the islands of Terceira, Pico, Faial, São Jorge and Flores. Because there was such a large Flemish settlement, the Azores became known as the Flemish Islands or the Isles of Flanders.

Prince Henry the Navigator was responsible for this Flemish settlement. His sister, Isabel, was married to Philip the Good, Duke of Burgundy, Flanders at the time belonging to Burgundy. There was a revolt against Philip's rule, and disease and hunger became rampant. Isabel appealed to Henry to allow some of the unruly Flemings to settle in the Azores. He granted this and supplied them with means of transport and goods.

The 1522 earthquake and recovery
In 1522, Vila Franca do Campo, then the capital of São Miguel, was devastated by an earthquake and landslide that killed about 5,000 people, and the capital was moved to Ponta Delgada. The town of Vila Franca do Campo was rebuilt on the original site, and today is a thriving fishing and yachting port. Ponta Delgada received its city status in 1546. From the first settlement, the pioneers applied themselves to agriculture, and by the 15th century Graciosa was exporting wheat, barley, wine and brandy. The goods were sent to Terceira largely because of the proximity of that island.

Effects of the Portuguese succession crisis of 1580

Portugal fell into a dynastic crisis following the death of Cardinal-King Henry of Portugal in 1580. Of the various claimants to the crown, the most powerful was king Phillip II of Spain, who justified his rights to the Portuguese throne by the fact that his mother was a Portuguese royal princess, his maternal grandfather having been King Manuel I of Portugal. Following his proclamation in Santarém, António, Prior of Crato was acclaimed in the Azores in 1580 (through his envoy António da Costa) but was expelled from the continent by the Spaniards following the Battle of Alcântara. Yet, through the administration of Cipriano de Figueiredo, governor of Terceira (who continued to govern Terceira in the name of ill-fated, former King Sebastian of Portugal), the Azoreans resisted Spanish attempts to conquer the islands (including specifically at the Battle of Salga).

In 1583, Philip II of Spain, as King of Portugal, sent his fleet to clear the Azores of a combined multinational force of adventurers, mercenaries, volunteers, and soldiers who were attempting to establish the Azores as a staging post for a rival pretender to the Portuguese throne. Following the success of his fleet at the Battle of Ponta Delgada captured enemies were hanged from yardarms, as they were considered pirates by Philip II. Opponents receiving the news variously portrayed Philip II as a despot or "Black Legend"; the sort of insult widely made against contemporary monarchs engaged in aggressive empire building and the European wars of religion. Figueiredo and Violante do Canto helped organize a resistance on Terceira that influenced some of the response of the other islands, even as internal politics and support for Philip's faction increased on the other islands (including specifically on São Miguel, where the Gonçalvez da Câmara family supported the Spanish claimant).

English raids of 1589 and 1598

An English raid of the Azores in 1589 successfully plundered some islands and harbouring ships; eight years later, a second raid failed – the Islands Voyage.

Iberian Union

Spain held the Azores under the Iberian Union from 1580–1642 (called the "Babylonian captivity" in the Azores). The Azores were the last part of the Portuguese Empire to resist Philip's reign over Portugal (Macau resisted any official recognition), until the defeat of forces loyal to the Prior of Crato with the Conquest of the Azores in 1583. Portuguese control resumed with the end of the Iberian Union in 1640, and the beginning of the Portuguese Restoration War, not by the professional military, who were occupied with warfare on the Portuguese mainland, but by local people attacking a fortified Castilian garrison.

Overpopulation and emigration

In the late 16th century, the Azores and Madeira began to face problems of overpopulation. Responding to the consequent economic problems, some people of the Azores began to emigrate to Brazil.

Liberal Wars of 1828–1834
The Portuguese Civil War (1828–1834) had strong repercussions in the Azores. In 1829, in Praia da Vitória, the liberals won over the absolutists, making Terceira Island the main headquarters of the new Portuguese regime and also where the Council of Regency of Maria II of Portugal was established. Beginning in 1868, Portugal issued its stamps overprinted with "" for use in the islands. Between 1892 and 1906, it also issued separate stamps for the three administrative districts of the time.

Arbitrary district divisions 1836–1976
From 1836 to 1976, the archipelago was divided into three districts, equivalent (except in area) to those in the Portuguese mainland. The division was arbitrary and did not follow the natural island groups, rather reflecting the location of each district capital on the three main cities (none of which were on the western group).
Angra do Heroísmo consisted of Terceira, São Jorge, and Graciosa, with the capital at Angra do Heroísmo on Terceira.
Horta consisted of Pico, Faial, Flores, and Corvo, with the capital at Horta on Faial.
Ponta Delgada consisted of São Miguel and Santa Maria, with the capital at Ponta Delgada on São Miguel.

Modern period

In 1931, the Azores (together with Madeira and Portuguese Guinea) revolted against the Ditadura Nacional and were held briefly by rebel military.

In 1943, during World War II, the Portuguese ruler António de Oliveira Salazar leased air and naval bases in the Azores to Great Britain. The occupation of these facilities in October 1943 was codenamed Operation Alacrity by the British. This was a key turning point in the Battle of the Atlantic, enabling the Royal Air Force, the U.S. Army Air Forces, and the U.S. Navy to provide aerial coverage in the Mid-Atlantic gap. This helped them to protect convoys and to hunt hostile German U-boats.

In 1944, the U.S. constructed a small and short-lived air base on the island of Santa Maria. In 1945, a new base was constructed on the island of Terceira, named Lajes Field. This air base is in an area called Lajes, a broad, flat sea terrace that had been a large farm. Lajes Field is a plateau rising out of the sea on the northeast corner of the island. This air base is a joint American and Portuguese venture. Lajes Field continues to support the American and Portuguese Armed Forces.

During the Cold War, U.S. Navy P-3 Orion anti-submarine warfare squadrons patrolled the North Atlantic Ocean for Soviet Navy submarines and surface warships. Since its opening, Lajes Field has been used for refuelling American cargo planes bound for Europe, Africa, and the Middle East. The airfield also has a small commercial terminal handling scheduled and chartered passenger flights from the other islands in the Azores, Europe, Africa, and North America.

Following the Carnation Revolution of 1974, which deposed the Estado Novo dictatorship in Lisbon, Portugal and its territories across the world entered into a period of great political uncertainty. The Azorean Liberation Front attempted to take advantage of this instability immediately after the revolution, hoping to establish an independent Azores, until operations ceased in 1975.

In 1976, the Azores became the Autonomous Region of the Azores, one of the autonomous regions of Portugal, and the subdistricts of the Azores were eliminated. In 2003, the Azores saw international attention when United States President George W. Bush, British Prime Minister Tony Blair, Spanish Prime Minister José María Aznar, and Portuguese Prime Minister José Manuel Durão Barroso held a summit there days before the commencement of the Iraq War.

Geography

Each of the islands has its own distinct geomorphological characteristics that make them unique:
Corvo (the smallest island) is a crater of a major Plinian eruption
Flores (its neighbor on the North American Plate) is a rugged island carved by many valleys and escarpments
Faial is characterized for its shield volcano and caldera (Caldeira Volcano)
Graciosa is known for its active Furnas do Enxofre and mixture of volcanic cones and plains
São Jorge is a long slender island, formed from fissural eruptions over thousands of years
Terceira, almost circular, is the location of one of the largest craters in the region
São Miguel is the largest island and is pitted with many large craters and fields of spatter cones
Santa Maria – the oldest island – is heavily eroded, being one of the few places to encounter brown sandy beaches in the archipelago.

These islands can be divided into three recognizable groups located on the Azores Plateau:
The Eastern Group of São Miguel, Santa Maria and Formigas Islets
The Central Group of Terceira, Graciosa, São Jorge, Pico and Faial
The Western Group of Flores and Corvo.

São Jorge, Pico and Faial are also collectively called  (‘Islands of the Triangle’).

Several sub-surface reefs (particularly the Dollabarat on the fringe of the Formigas), banks (specifically the Princess Alice Bank and D. João de Castro Bank), as well as many hydrothermal vents and sea-mounts are monitored by the regional authorities, owing to the complex geotectonic and socioeconomic significance within the economic exclusion zone of the archipelago.

Geology 

From a geostructural perspective, the Azores are located above an active triple junction between three of the world's major tectonic plates (the North American Plate, the Eurasian Plate and the African Plate), a condition that has translated into the existence of many faults and fractures in this region of the Atlantic. The westernmost islands of the archipelago (Corvo and Flores) are located on the North American Plate, while the remaining islands are located within the boundary that divides the Eurasian and African plates.

The principal tectonic structures that exist in the region of the Azores are the Mid-Atlantic Ridge, the Terceira Rift, the Azores Fracture Zone and the Glória Fault. The Mid-Atlantic Ridge is the main frontier between the North American Plate and the African-Eurasian Plates that crosses the Azores Plateau between the islands of Flores and Faial from north to south then to the southwest; it is an extensive form crossed by many transform faults running perpendicular to its north–south orientation, that is seismically active and susceptible to volcanism.

Rift and fault geology 
The Terceira Rift is a system of fractures that extends from the Mid-Atlantic Ridge to the Glória Fault that represents the main frontier between the Eurasian and African Plates. Its northwest limit connects to the Mid-Atlantic Ridge, while the southeast section intersects the Gloria Fault southeast of the island of Santa Maria.

The Azores Fracture Zone extends from the Glória Fault and encompasses a relatively inactive area to the south of the islands of the Central and Eastern groups north to the Terceira Rift, along a 45° angle. The Glória Fault, for its part, extends  along a linear line from the Azores to the Azores–Gibraltar Transform Fault.

Volcanoes 
The island's volcanism is associated with the rifting along the Azores Triple Junction; the spread of the crust along the existing faults and fractures has produced many of the active volcanic and seismic events, while supported by buoyant upwelling in the deeper mantle, some associate with an Azores hotspot. Most of the volcanic activity has centered, primarily, along the Terceira Rift.

From the beginning of the island's settlement, around the 15th century, there have been 28 registered volcanic eruptions (15 terrestrial and 13 submarine). The last significant volcanic eruption, the Capelinhos volcano, occurred off the coast of the island of Faial in 1957; the most recent volcanic activity occurred in the seamounts and submarine volcanoes off the coast of Serreta and in the Pico-São Jorge Channel.

The islands have many examples of volcano-built geomorphology including caves and lava tubes (such as the Gruta das Torres, Algar do Carvão, Gruta do Natal, Gruta das Cinco Ribeiras), the coastal lava fields (like the coast of Feteiras, Faial, the Mistério of Prainha or São João on Pico Island) in addition to the inactive cones in central São Miguel Island, the aforementioned Capelinhos on Faial, the volcanic complexes of Terceira or Plinian caldeira of Corvo Island.
The islands of the archipelago were formed through volcanic and seismic activity during the Neogene Period; the first embryonic surfaces started to appear in the waters of Santa Maria during the Miocene epoch (from circa 8 million years ago).

The sequence of the island formation has been generally characterized as: Santa Maria (8.12 Ma), São Miguel (4.1 Ma), Terceira (3.52 Ma), Graciosa (2.5 Ma), Flores (2.16 Ma), Faial (0.7 Ma), São Jorge (0.55 Ma), Corvo (0.7 Ma) and the youngest, Pico (0.27 Ma). Although all islands have experienced volcanism during their geological history, within recorded "human settlement" history the islands of Santa Maria, Graciosa, Flores, and Corvo have not experienced any volcanic eruptions; in addition to active fumaroles and hot-springs, the remaining islands have had sporadic eruptions since the 14th century. Apart from the Capelinhos volcano in 1957–1958, the last recorded instance of "island formation" occurred off the coast of São Miguel, when the island of Sabrina was briefly formed.

Earthquakes 
Owing to its geodynamic environment, the region has been a center of intense seismic activity, particularly along its tectonic boundaries on the Mid-Atlantic Ridge and Terceira Rift. Seismic events although frequent, are usually tectonic or vulco-tectonic in nature, but in general are of low to medium intensities, occasionally punctuated by events of level 5 or greater on the Richter magnitude scale. The most severe earthquake was registered in 1757, near Calheta on the island of São Jorge, which exceeded 7 on the Richter magnitude scale.

In comparison, the 1522 earthquake that was mentioned by historian Gaspar Frutuoso measured 6.8, but its effects were judged to be X (Extreme) on the Mercalli intensity scale, and was responsible for the destruction of Vila Franca do Campo and landslides that may have killed more than 5,000 of the inhabitants.

Biome
The archipelago lies in the Palearctic realm and has a unique biotic community that includes the Macaronesian subtropical laurissilva, with many endemic species of plants and animals. There are at least 6,112 terrestrial species, of which about 411 are endemic. The majority (75%) of these endemics are animals, mostly arthropods and mollusks. New species are found regularly in the Azores (e.g., 30 different new species of land snails were discovered circa 2013).

Even though the Azores look very green and sometimes wild, the vegetation has been extremely altered. A great part of it has been wiped out in the past 600 years for its valuable wood (for tools, buildings, boats, fire wood, and so on) and to clear land for agriculture. As a result, it is estimated that more than half of insects on the Graciosa island have disappeared or will become extinct.

Many cultivated places (which are traditionally dedicated to pasture or to growing taro, potatoes, maize and other crops) have now been abandoned, especially as a result of emigration. Consequently, some invasive plants have filled these deserted and disturbed lands. Hydrangeas are another potential pest, but their threat is less serious. Notwithstanding the fact that hydrangeas were introduced from America or Asia, some locals consider them a symbol of the archipelago and propagate them along roadsides. Cryptomeria, the Japanese cedar, is a conifer extensively grown for its timber. The two most common of these alien species are Pittosporum undulatum and Hedychium gardnerianum. Reforestation efforts with native laurissilva vegetation have been accomplished successfully in many parts of the Azores.

The Azores has at least two endemic living bird species. The Azores bullfinch, or Priolo, is restricted to remnant laurisilva forest in the mountains at the eastern end of São Miguel and is classified by BirdLife International as endangered. Monteiro's storm petrel, described to science as recently as 2008, is known to breed in just two locations in the islands but may occur more widely. An extinct species of owl, the São Miguel scops owl, has recently been described, which probably became extinct after human settlement because of habitat destruction and the introduction of alien species. Five species of flightless rail (Rallus spp.) once existed on the islands, as did a flightless quail (Coturnix sp.) and another species of bullfinch, the greater Azores bullfinch, but these also went extinct after human colonization. Eleven subspecies of bird are endemic to the islands. The Azores has an endemic bat, the Azores noctule, which has an unusually high frequency of diurnal flight.

The islets of the Formigas (the Portuguese word for "ants"), including the area known as the Dollabarat Reef, have a rich environment of maritime species, such as black coral and manta rays, different species of sharks, whales, and sea turtles. Seventeen new marine reserves (with special conservation status) were added to the Azorean Marine Park (which covers around ). On São Miguel there are notable micro-habitats formed by hot springs that host extremophile microorganisms.

Climate

The archipelago is spread out at roughly the same latitude as the southern half of mainland Portugal, but its location in the mid-Atlantic Ocean gives it a generally tepid, oceanic, mild to warm subtropical climate, with mild annual oscillations.

‘Azores High’ anticyclone
The Azores archipelago is located in a transition and confrontation zone between air masses of tropical origin and masses of cooler air of polar origin. The climate of the archipelago is largely determined by variations in the atmospheric pressure field over the North Atlantic. These variations conditioned by the mass of the American Continent and the Atlantic water mass are overlapped by a semi-permanent subtropical Atlantic anticyclone, commonly known as the Azores High. This anticyclone experiences seasonal variations which can affect the archipelago in many ways.

In winter, the Azores anticyclone is positioned further south, and allows for a descent of the Polar front, approaching it to the archipelago. In summer, on the other hand, the anticyclone's movement further north, leads to the departure of the polar front and its associated disturbances towards higher latitudes. Far enough away from the mainland coasts, the continental air masses that reach the archipelago are weakened by the maritime influence.

The same can not be said for the higher altitudes (e.g. Mount Pico), where upper air masses of a continental origin and with a more direct pathway can reach the surface and present those areas with drier air and more extreme temperatures. At the same time, this free atmosphere circulating air transports aerosols to the archipelago, namely volcanic ash or fine sands from the Sahara desert, which sporadically affect the radiation and air quality.

Köppen classification

Under the Köppen climate classification, the eastern group (São Miguel and Santa Maria) is usually classified as Mediterranean while the central and western group (especially Flores and Corvo) is increasingly more humid subtropical and overall rainier because of the effects of the Gulf Stream.

Salvador Rivas-Martínez data presents several different bioclimatic zones for the Azores. Seasonal lag is extreme in the low-sun half of the year, with December being milder than April in terms of mean temperatures. During summer the lag is somewhat lower, with August being the warmest month, though September is usually as warm or warmer than July.

Temperatures, humidity, and sunshine 
There has never been a frost, snowfall, freeze or even temperatures below  recorded at sea level on any of the islands. The coldest weather in winter usually comes from northwesterly air masses originating from Labrador in Canada. However, since those air masses are warmed up as they pass across the warmer Atlantic Ocean, temperatures by day even then exceed .

The average relative humidity can range from 80% at the coast to over 90% above . However, higher elevations above the planetary boundary layer can experience extremely low values close to 10%. Summers are especially humid in August and may increase the perceived temperature by a few degrees. Winters are not only very mild but also very humid and contribute substantially to the annual precipitation.

Insolation is relatively low, with 35-40% of the total possible value for sunshine, and higher in topographically lower islands such as Graciosa or Santa Maria, inversely proportional to precipitation. This is directly caused by the orographic lift of humid air masses and is especially pronounced in islands marked by high orography.

Hurricanes

With a greater rarity, especially in late summer and autumn, despite the northern position that the archipelago occupies, the Azores can be affected by the passage of tropical cyclones, or tropical storms derived from them, some can result from anomalies of low latitude systems while others result from the return, back to the Atlantic, after a route close to or even over the American continent. Though often small and in the process of dissipation, these cyclones result in many of the worst storms the archipelago is subject to.

A total of 14 tropical or subtropical cyclones have affected the region in history. Most of them were either extratropical or tropical storms when they affected the region, although several Category 1 hurricanes have reached the Azores.

The following storms have impacted the region while at Category 1 strength:

Hurricane Fran in 1973
Hurricane Emmy in 1976
Hurricane Gordon in 2006
Hurricane Gordon in 2012
Hurricane Alex in 2016

Several tropical storms have hit the region, including

Tropical Storm Irma in 1978
Hurricane Bonnie in 1992
Hurricane Charley in 1992
Hurricane Erika in 1997
Hurricane Gaston in 2016

Storms that were extratropical when they impacted the region include

Hurricane Tanya in 1995
Tropical Storm Ana in 2003
Tropical Storm Grace in 2009

In addition, the 2005 Azores subtropical storm affected the region in October 2005.

Economy 
In order of importance, the main sectors of employment of the Azores are services, agriculture, fishery, industry and tourism. Agricultural products include São Jorge cheese.

Demographics
The Azores are divided into 19 municipalities; each municipality is further divided into freguesias (civil administrative parishes), of which there is a total of 156 in all of the Azores.

There are six cities in the Azores: Ponta Delgada, Lagoa and Ribeira Grande on the island of São Miguel; Angra do Heroísmo and Praia da Vitória on the island of Terceira, and Horta on Faial. Three of these, Ponta Delgada, Angra and Horta are considered capital/administrative cities to the regional government: homes to the President (Ponta Delgada), the Judiciary (Angra) and the Regional Assembly (Horta). Angra also serves as the ecclesiastical centre of the Roman Catholic Diocese of Angra, the episcopal see of the Azores.

Population

According to the 2019 Census, population in the Azores was 242,796. The Azores were uninhabited when Portuguese navigators arrived in the early 15th century; settlement began in 1439 with migrants mostly from mainland Portugal and, to a lesser extent, Flemish, Spanish, French, Italians, Germans, Scottish, Jews, Moors and blacks from Guinea, Cape Verde and São Tomé.

The islands sometimes served as a waypoint for ships carrying African slaves.

Emigration
Since the 17th century, many Azoreans have emigrated, mainly to Brazil, Uruguay, the United States and Canada. Rhode Island and southeastern Massachusetts are the primary destination for Azorean emigrants. From 1921 to 1977, about 250,000 Azoreans immigrated to Rhode Island and Massachusetts. Northern California was the final destination for many of the Massachusetts immigrants who then moved on to the San Joaquin Valley, especially the city of Turlock. In the late 19th century many Azoreans immigrated to the Hawaiian islands. The tuna fishing industry drew a significant number of Azoreans to the Point Loma neighborhood of San Diego. During the Great Recession of the early 21st century, Portugal was in a recession from 2011 until 2013, which resulted in high levels of unemployment across the mainland as well as the Azores. The Great Recession led to an increase of emigration from the Azores.

Florianópolis and Porto Alegre in the Southern Region of Brazil were founded by Azoreans, who accounted for over half of Rio Grande do Sul and Santa Catarina's populations in the late 18th century. As late as 1960, mass immigration currents were registered to Brazil, and many were from the Azores.

Politics

Since 1976, the Azores has been an autonomous region integrated within the framework of the Portuguese Republic. It has its own government and autonomous legislature within its own political-administrative statute and organic law. Its governmental organs include: the legislative assembly, a unicameral parliament composed of 52 elected deputies, elected by universal suffrage for a four-year term; the regional government and presidency, with parliamentary legitimacy, composed of a president, a vice-president and seven regional secretaries responsible for day-to-day operations. It is represented in the Council of Ministers by a representative appointed by the president of the Republic, which was created during the revision of the constitution of 2004 (which, among other things, removed the older Portuguese representative that was appointed by the president of the Republic, beholden to the Council of State and coincident with the president). Since becoming a Portuguese autonomous region, the executive branch of the regional authority has been located in Ponta Delgada, the legislative branch in Horta, and the judicial branch in Angra do Heroísmo.

The islands of the archipelago do not have independent status in law, except in electoral law and are governed by 19 municipalities that subdivide the islands. In addition, until the administrative reform of the 19th century, the following civil parishes had municipal standing: Topo (today integrated into the municipality of Calheta, São Jorge); Praia (today integrated into municipality of Santa Cruz da Graciosa); São Sebastião (today an integral part of the municipality of Angra do Heroísmo); Capelas (now part of the municipality of Ponta Delgada); and Água de Pau (now a civil parish in the municipality of Lagoa). These civil parishes still retain their titles of "vila" in name only; the populations of Capelas and neighbouring parish still protest the change and promote the restoration of their status. The municipalities are further subdivided into several civil parishes, with the exception of Corvo (the only municipality by law without a civil parish, owing to its size).

Azorean politics is dominated by the two largest Portuguese political parties, the Socialist Party and Social Democratic Party, the former holding a majority in the Legislative Assembly. The Democratic and Social Center / People's Party, the Left Bloc, the Unitary Democratic Coalition and the People's Monarchist Party are also represented. , the President of the Azores is Social Democratic Party leader José Manuel Bolieiro. Although the Socialist Party dominates the regional politics, the Social Democratic Party is traditionally popular in city and town council elections.

As part of Portugal, the Azores are in the European Union and Schengen Area. They are also in the European Union Customs Union and VAT area but levy a lower rate of VAT than applies on the mainland. The Azores, like Madeira and the Canary Islands, are among member state territories with special status, as one of the designated "Outermost Regions".

Transport

Aviation

Each of the nine islands has an airport, although the majority are airfields rather than airports. The primary (and busiest) airport of the island group is João Paulo II Airport. The commercial terminals in Ponta Delgada, Horta, Vila do Porto and Santa Cruz das Flores are operated by ANA – Aeroportos de Portugal, a public entity that oversees the operations of airports across Portugal. The remaining, except for Lajes Field, are operated by the Regional Government. Lajes is a military airbase, as well as a commercial airport, and is operated by the Portuguese Armed Forces in conjunction with the United States.

The airports are:
Santa Maria: Santa Maria Airport (LPAZ)
São Miguel: João Paulo II Airport (LPPD)
Terceira: Lajes Airport (LPLA)
São Jorge: São Jorge Airport (LPSJ)
Pico: Pico Airport (LPPI)
Faial: Horta Airport (LPHR)
Graciosa: Graciosa Airport (LPGR)
Flores: Flores Airport (LPFL)
Corvo: Corvo Airport (LPCR)

Marine transportation

The Azores has had a long history of marine transport to overcome distances and establish inter-community contacts and trade. Consequently, the shipbuilding industry developed in many islands, from small fishing boats to whaling sloops and larger passenger services. Passenger traffic to the main islands (São Miguel, Santa Maria, Terceira and Faial) began in the 17th century, and between the 18th–19th century, the Pico Yacht controlled the lucrative summer traffic season.

After 1871, the Insulana Shipping Company was the only entity responsible for regular traffic between the islands (except Corvo), Madeira and the United States. Finally, cargo and passenger transportation ceased in the 1970s, and the ships were sold or converted into tuna fishing boats. For the next 20 years, commercial maritime service between the islands ceased (except between Faial-Pico and Lajes das Flores-Vila do Corvo).

Transmaçor (Transportes Marítimos Açorianos, Lda.) was founded in 1987. The shipping company operates four to six daily connections between Horta and Madalena throughout the year, using its small fleet of ships, in addition to inter-island connections between Faial, Pico, São Jorge and Terceira during the summer months. New initiatives began in the late 1990s: the catamaran Iapetos began services, followed by Lady of Mann and Golfinho Azul (chartered by Açorline).

In 2005, Atlânticoline was established, providing transport services. In 2009, Atlanticoline was involved in a controversial rejection of a 750-passenger, 150-vehicle ship ordered from the Estaleiros de Viana do Castelo (ENVC). The Atlantida, a 50 million Euro cruiser (as part of a two-ship deal with the other named Anticiclone) was rejected in 2009 by Atlanticoline for the under-performance of the power-plant. Although it would only result in a five-minute delay between islands, the public company rejected the ship, and the contract was broken over the builder's inability to deliver the required ship on time. While the ship was being shopped to other interested parties (Hugo Chávez once considered purchasing the ferryboat in 2010), no interested buyers appeared, and ENVC decided to cede the Atlantida to Atlânticoline as part of the latter's open international competition to charter two ships in 2012.

In June 2011, the Regional Government announced that it would purchase 60% of Transmaçor, equivalent to 500,000 Euro of the company's capital. With this transaction the autonomous government of the Azores ceded control, of which it once had 88% of the capital. The signed memorandum of understanding concluded negotiations between the various parties involved, under which the liability of Transmaçor (worth a total of 8 million Euro) was divided equally between the government and businessman José E. Almeida, who is now the holder of a majority stake in the company. Similarly, the Regional Government approved the consolidation of the three individual port authorities (Administração dos Portos do Triângulo e Grupo Ocidental, Administração dos Portos da Terceira e Graciosa and the Administração dos Portos das Ilhas de São Miguel e Santa Maria) and regional Portos dos Açores into one entity that resulted in a 2.2 million Euro cost savings, in addition to a reduction from 11 to three administrators.

Culture

Religious societies and festivals
Religious festivals, patron saints, and traditional holidays mark the Azorean calendar. The most important religious events are tied with the festivals associated with the cult of the Holy Spirit, commonly referred to as the festivals of the Holy Spirit (or ), rooted in millenarian dogma and held on all islands from May to September. These festivals are very important to the Azorean people, who are primarily Roman Catholic, and combine religious rituals with processions celebrating the benevolence and egalitarianism of neighbours. On Terceira, for example, these impérios have grown into ornate buildings painted and cared for by the local brotherhoods in their respective parishes. The events focus on the members of local parishes, not tourists, but all are welcome, as sharing is one of the main principles of the festivals. Some limited events focus on tourists, including a public event that the city government of Ponta Delgada on the island of São Miguel holds, which attracts visitors and locals.

The Festival of the Lord Holy Christ of the Miracles in Ponta Delgada is the largest individual religious event in the Azores and takes place on Rogation Sunday. Pilgrims from within the Portuguese diaspora normally travel to Ponta Delgada to participate in an afternoon procession behind the image of Christ along the flower-decorated streets of the city. Although the solemn procession is only held on one day, the events of the Festival of Senhor Santo Cristo occur over a period of a week and involve a ritual of moving the image between the main church and convent nightly, ultimately culminating in the procession, which is televised within the Azores and to the Portuguese diaspora.

The Sanjoaninas Festivities in Angra do Heroísmo on Terceira are held in June honoring Saint Anthony, Saint Peter and Saint John the Baptist, in a large religious celebration. The festival of Our Lady of Lourdes, patron saint of whalers, begins in Lajes on Pico Island on the last Sunday of August and runs through the week—Whalers Week. It is marked by social and cultural events connected to the tradition of whale hunting. The Wine Harvest Festival, takes place during the first week of September and is a century-old custom of the people of Pico.

On Corvo, the people celebrate their patron saint  (Our Lady of Miracles) on 15 August every year in addition to the festivals of the Divine Holy Spirit. The  (August Sea Festival), takes place every year beginning on 15 August in Praia Formosa on Santa Maria.

 is celebrated in the Azores. Parades and pageants are the heart of the Carnaval festivities. There is lively music, colorful costumes, hand-made masks, and floats. The traditional bullfights in the bullring are ongoing as is the running of bulls in the streets.

International visitors
During the 18th and 19th centuries, Graciosa was host to many prominent figures, including
Chateaubriand, the French writer who passed through upon his escape to America during the French Revolution
Almeida Garrett, the Portuguese poet who visited an uncle and wrote some poetry while there
Prince Albert of Monaco, the 19th century oceanographer who led several expeditions in the waters of the Azores. He arrived on his yacht Hirondelle, and visited the furna da caldeira, the noted hot springs grotto.
author Mark Twain published The Innocents Abroad in 1869 – a travel book, where he described his time in the Azores.

Sports 
Notable sports teams in the Azores include Santa Clara (Primeira Liga), Lusitânia (Liga Portuguesa de Basquetebol), Fonte do Bastardo (Portuguese Volleyball First Division) and Sporting Clube da Horta (Portuguese Handball Second Division).

The Rallye Açores is an international rally race held annually since 1965, which was part of the European Rally Championship and the Intercontinental Rally Challenge.

The Azores Senior Open was a golf tournament held in 2008 as part of the European Seniors Tour.

See also
Macaronesia
Postage stamps and postal history of the Azores
List of islands of Portugal

Citations

General and cited sources

External links

Azores Regional Government 

 
Autonomous Regions of Portugal
Geography of Southwestern Europe
Islands of Macaronesia
Mid-Atlantic Ridge
Outermost regions of the European Union
Provinces of Portugal (1936–1976)